Pallacanestro Virtus Roma history and statistics in FIBA Europe and Euroleague Basketball (company) competitions.

1980s

1982–83 FIBA Korać Cup, 3rd–tier
The 1982–83 FIBA Korać Cup was the 12th installment of the European 3rd-tier level professional basketball club competition FIBA Korać Cup, running from October 6, 1982 to March 8, 1983. The trophy was won by the title holder Limoges CSP, who defeated -for second consecutive time- Šibenka by a result of 94–86 at Deutschlandhalle in West Berlin, West Germany. Overall, Banco di Roma achieved in present competition a record of 8 wins against 2 defeat, in three successive rounds. More detailed:

First round
 Tie played on October 6, 1982 and on October 13, 1982.

|}

Second round
 Tie played on November 3, 1982 and on November 10, 1982.

|}

Top 16
 Day 1 (December 8, 1982)

|}

 Day 2 (December 15, 1982)

|}

 Day 3 (January 12, 1983)

|}

 Day 4 (January 19, 1983)

|}

 Day 5 (January 25, 1983)

|}

 Day 6 (February 2, 1983)

|}

 Group A standings:

1983–84 FIBA European Champions Cup, 1st–tier
The 1983–84 FIBA European Champions Cup was the 27th installment of the European top-tier level professional basketball club competition FIBA European Champions Cup (now called EuroLeague), running from September 15, 1983 to March 29, 1984. The trophy was won by Banco di Roma, who defeated FC Barcelona by a result of 79–73 at Patinoire des Vernets in Geneva, Switzerland. Overall, Banco di Roma achieved in the present competition a record of 12 wins against 3 defeats, in five successive rounds. More detailed:

First round
 Bye

Second round
 Tie played on September 29, 1983 and on October 6, 1983.

|}

Top 12
 Tie played on October 27, 1983 and on November 3, 1983.

|}

Semifinals
 Day 1 (December 8, 1983)

|}

 Day 2 (December 15, 1983)

|}

 Day 3 (January 12, 1984)

|}

 Day 4 (January 19, 1984)

|}

 Day 5 (January 26, 1984)

|}

 Day 6 (February 2, 1984)

|}

 Day 7 (February 16, 1984)

|}

 Day 8 (February 23, 1984)

|}

 Day 9 (March 1, 1984)

|}

 Day 10 (March 8, 1984)

|}

 Semifinals group stage standings:

Final
 March 29, 1984 at Patinoire des Vernets in Geneva, Switzerland.

|}

1984–85 FIBA European Champions Cup, 1st–tier
The 1984–85 FIBA European Champions Cup was the 28th installment of the European top-tier level professional basketball club competition FIBA European Champions Cup (now called EuroLeague), running from September 21, 1984 to April 3, 1985. The trophy was won by Cibona, who defeated Real Madrid by a result of 87–78 at Peace and Friendship Stadium in Piraeus, Greece. Overall, Banco di Roma achieved in the present competition a record of 7 wins against 7 defeats, in four successive rounds. More detailed:

First round
 Bye

Second round
 Tie played on October 4, 1984 and on October 11, 1984.

|}

Top 12
 Tie played on November 1, 1984 and on November 8, 1984.

|}

Semifinals
 Day 1 (December 6, 1984)

|}

 Day 2 (December 13, 1984)

|}

 Day 3 (January 10, 1985)

|}

 Day 4 (January 16, 1985)

|}

 Day 5 (January 24, 1985)

|}

 Day 6 (January 31, 1985)

|}

 Day 7 (February 21, 1985)

|}

 Day 8 (February 28, 1985)

|}

 Day 9 (March 6, 1985)

|}

 Day 10 (March 14, 1985)

|}

 Semifinals group stage standings:

1985–86 FIBA Korać Cup, 3rd–tier
The 1985–86 FIBA Korać Cup was the 15th installment of the European 3rd-tier level professional basketball club competition FIBA Korać Cup, running from October 2, 1985 to March 27, 1986. The trophy was won by Banco di Roma, who defeated Mobilgirgi Caserta by a result of 157–150 in a two-legged final on a home and away basis. Overall, Banco di Roma achieved in present competition a record of 8 wins against 2 defeats, in five successive rounds.

First round
 Bye

Second round
 Bye

Top 16
 Day 1 (December 4, 1985)

|}

 Day 2 (December 11, 1985)

|}

 Day 3 (January 8, 1986)

|}

 Day 4 (January 15, 1986)

|}

 Day 5 (January 22, 1986)

|}

 Day 6 (January 29, 1986)

|}

 Group C standings:

Semifinals
 Tie played on February 19, 1986 and on February 26, 1986.

|}

Finals
 Tie played on March 20, 1986 at PalaMaggiò di Castel Morrone in Caserta, Italy and on March 27, 1986 at PalaEUR in Rome, Italy.

|}

1990s

1991–92 FIBA Korać Cup, 3rd–tier
The 1991–92 FIBA Korać Cup was the 21st installment of the European 3rd-tier level professional basketball club competition FIBA Korać Cup, running from October 2, 1991 to March 18, 1992. The trophy was won by Il Messaggero Roma, who defeated Scavolini Pesaro by a result of 193–180 in a two-legged final on a home and away basis. Overall, Il Messaggero Roma achieved in present competition a record of 13 wins against 2 defeats plus 1 draw, in six successive rounds. More detailed:

First round
 Tie played on October 1, 1991 and on October 9, 1991.

|}

Second round
 Tie played on October 30, 1991 and on November 6, 1991.

|}

Top 16
 Day 1 (November 27, 1991)

|}

 Day 2 (December 4, 1991)

|}

 Day 3 (December 11, 1991)

|}

 Day 4 (December 18, 1991)

|}

 Day 5 (January 8, 1992)

|}
*Overtime at the end of regulation (85–85).

 Day 6 (January 15, 1992)

|}

 Group B standings:

Quarterfinals
 Tie played on January 28, 1992 and on February 5, 1992.

|}

Semifinals
 Tie played on February 19, 1992 and on February 26, 1992.

|}

Finals
 Tie played on March 11, 1992 at PalaEUR in Rome, Italy and on March 18, 1992 at Palasport Comunale in Pesaro, Italy.

|}

1992–93 FIBA Korać Cup, 3rd–tier
The 1992–93 FIBA Korać Cup was the 22nd installment of the European 3rd-tier level professional basketball club competition FIBA Korać Cup, running from September 9, 1992 to March 18, 1993. The trophy was won by Philips Milano, who defeated Virtus Roma by a result of 201–181 in a two-legged final on a home and away basis. Overall, Virtus Roma achieved in present competition a record of 10 wins against 6 defeats, in seven successive rounds. More detailed:

First round
 Bye

Second round
 Tie played on October 1, 1992 and on October 7, 1992.

|}

Third round
 Tie played on October 28, 1992 and on November 4, 1992.

|}

Top 16
 Day 1 (November 25, 1992)

|}

 Day 2 (December 2, 1992)

|}

 Day 3 (December 9, 1992)

|}

 Day 4 (December 16, 1992)

|}

 Day 5 (January 6, 1993)

|}

 Day 6 (January 13, 1993)

|}

 Group C standings:

Quarterfinals
 Tie played on January 27, 1993 and on February 3, 1993.

|}

Semifinals
 Tie played on February 17, 1993 and on February 24, 1993.

|}

Finals
 Tie played on March 9, 1993 at PalaEUR in Rome, Italy and on March 18, 1993 at Forum di Milanofiori in Assago, Italy.

|}

1996–97 FIBA Korać Cup, 3rd–tier
The 1996–97 FIBA Korać Cup was the 26th installment of the European 3rd-tier level professional basketball club competition FIBA Korać Cup, running from September 11, 1996 to April 3, 1997. The trophy was won by Aris, who defeated Tofaş by a result of 154–147 in a two-legged final on a home and away basis. Overall, Telemarket Roma achieved in present competition a record of 8 wins against 4 defeats, in five successive rounds. More detailed:

First round
 Bye

Second round
 Day 1 (October 2, 1996)

|}

 Day 2 (October 9, 1996)

|}

 Day 3 (October 16, 1996)

|}

 Day 4 (November 6, 1996)

|}

 Day 5 (November 13, 1996)

|}

 Day 6 (November 20, 1996)

|}

 Group I standings:

Third round
 Tie played on December 4, 1996 and on December 11, 1996.

|}

Top 16
 Tie played on January 15, 1997 and on January 22, 1997.

|}

Quarterfinals
 Tie played on February 12, 1997 and on February 19, 1997.

|}

1997–98 FIBA Korać Cup, 3rd–tier
The 1997–98 FIBA Korać Cup was the 27th installment of the European 3rd-tier level professional basketball club competition FIBA Korać Cup, running from September 10, 1997 to April 1, 1998. The trophy was won by Mash Jeans Verona, who defeated Crvena zvezda by a result of 141–138 in a two-legged final on a home and away basis. Overall, Calze Pompea Roma achieved in present competition a record of 11 wins against 3 defeats, in six successive rounds. More detailed:

First round
 Bye

Second round
 Day 1 (October 1, 1997)

|}

 Day 2 (October 8, 1997)

|}

 Day 3 (October 22, 1997)

|}

 Day 4 (November 5, 1997)

|}

 Day 5 (November 12, 1997)

|}

 Day 6 (November 19, 1997)

|}

 Group M standings:

Third round
 Tie played on December 10, 1997 and on December 17, 1997.

|}

Top 16
 Tie played on January 14, 1998 and on January 21, 1998.

|}

Quarterfinals
 Tie played on February 11, 1998 and on February 18, 1998.

|}

Semifinals
 Tie played on March 4, 1998 and on March 11, 1998.

|}

1998–99 FIBA Korać Cup, 3rd–tier
The 1998–99 FIBA Korać Cup was the 28th installment of the European 3rd-tier level professional basketball club competition FIBA Korać Cup, running from September 16, 1998 to March 31, 1999. The trophy was won by FC Barcelona, who defeated Adecco Estudiantes by a result of 174–163 in a two-legged final on a home and away basis. Overall, Aeroporti di Roma Virtus achieved in present competition a record of 7 wins against 3 defeats, in four successive rounds. More detailed:

First round
 Bye

Second round
 Day 1 (October 7, 1998)

|}

 Day 2 (October 14, 1998)

|}

 Day 3 (October 21, 1998)

|}

 Day 4 (November 4, 1998)

|}

 Day 5 (November 11, 1998)

|}

 Day 6 (November 18, 1998)

|}

 Group M standings:

Third round
 Tie played on December 9, 1998 and on December 16, 1998.

|}

Top 16
 Tie played on January 13, 1999 and on January 20, 1999.

|}

2000s

1999–2000 FIBA Korać Cup, 3rd–tier
The 1999–2000 FIBA Korać Cup was the 29th installment of the European 3rd-tier level professional basketball club competition FIBA Korać Cup, running from September 15, 1999 to March 29, 2000. The trophy was won by Limoges CSP, who defeated Unicaja by a result of 131–118 in a two-legged final on a home and away basis. Overall, Aeroporti di Roma Virtus achieved in present competition a record of 10 wins against 2 defeats, in five successive rounds. More detailed:

First round
 Bye

Second round
 Day 1 (October 6, 1999)

|}

 Day 2 (October 13, 1999)

|}

 Day 3 (October 20, 1999)

|}

 Day 4 (November 3, 1999)

|}

 Day 5 (November 10, 1999)

|}
*Overtime at the end of regulation (63–63).

 Day 6 (November 17, 1999)

|}

 Group M standings:

Third round
 Tie played on December 8, 1999 and on December 15, 1999.

|}

Top 16
 Tie played on January 12, 2000 and on January 19, 2000.

|}

Quarterfinals
 Tie played on February 9, 2000 and on February 16, 2000.

|}

2003–04 Euroleague, 1st–tier
The 2003–04 Euroleague was the 4th season of the EuroLeague, under the newly formed Euroleague Basketball Company's authority, and it was the 47th installment of the European top-tier level professional club competition for basketball clubs, running from November 6, 2003 to May 1, 2004. The trophy was won by Maccabi Elite Tel Aviv, who defeated Skipper Bologna by a result of 118–74 at Nokia Arena in Tel Aviv, Israel. Overall, Lottomatica Roma achieved in present competition a record of 4 wins against 10 defeats, in only one round. More detailed:

Regular season
 Day 1 (November 3, 2003)

|}

 Day 2 (November 13, 2003)

|}

 Day 3 (November 20, 2003)

|}

 Day 4 (November 26, 2003)

|}

 Day 5 (December 4, 2003)

|}

 Day 6 (December 11, 2003)

|}

 Day 7 (December 18, 2003)

|}
*Overtime at the end of regulation (91–91).

 Day 8 (January 7, 2004)

|}

 Day 9 (January 15, 2004)

|}

 Day 10 (January 22, 2004)

|}

 Day 11 (January 28, 2004)

|}

 Day 12 (February 5, 2004)

|}

 Day 13 (February 12, 2004)

|}

 Day 14 (February 19, 2004)

|}

 Group A standings:

2005–06 ULEB Cup, 2nd–tier
The 2005–06 ULEB Cup was the 4th installment of ULEB's 2nd-tier level European-wide professional club basketball competition ULEB Cup (lately called EuroCup Basketball), running from November 8, 2005 to April 11, 2006. The trophy was won by Dynamo Moscow, who defeated Aris TT Bank by a result of 73–60 at Spiroudome in Charleroi, Belgium. Overall, Lottomatica Roma achieved in the present competition a record of 8 wins against 6 defeats, in three successive rounds. More detailed:

Regular season
 Day 1 (November 8, 2005)

|}

 Day 2 (November 15, 2005)

|}

 Day 3 (November 22, 2005)

|}

 Day 4 (November 29, 2005)

|}

 Day 5 (December 6, 2005)

|}

 Day 6 (December 13, 2005)

|}

 Day 7 (December 20, 2005)

|}

 Day 8 (January 3, 2006)

|}

 Day 9 (January 10, 2006)

|}

 Day 10 (January 17, 2006)

|}

 Group A standings:

Top 16
 Tie played on January 31, 2006 and on February 7, 2006.

|}

Quarterfinals
 Tie played on February 28, 2006 and on March 7, 2006.

|}

2006–07 Euroleague, 1st–tier
The 2006–07 Euroleague was the 7th season of the EuroLeague, under the Euroleague Basketball Company's authority, and it was the 50th installment of the European top-tier level professional club competition for basketball clubs, running from October 26, 2006 to May 6, 2007. The trophy was won by Panathinaikos, who defeated the title holder CSKA Moscow by a result of 93–91 at O.A.C.A. Olympic Indoor Hall in Athens, Greece. Overall, Lottomatica Roma achieved in present competition a record of 7 wins against 13 defeats, in two successive rounds. More detailed:

Regular season
 Day 1 (October 25, 2006)

|}

 Day 2 (November 1, 2006)

|}

Worldwide competitions

References

External links
FIBA Europe
Euroleague
ULEB
Eurocup

Basketball in Rome
Basketball teams in Lazio
EuroLeague-winning clubs